Hlabeni is a town in Harry Gwala District Municipality in the KwaZulu-Natal province of South Africa.

Flat-topped hill some 12 km north-west of Creighton. The name, also applied to the region east and north-east of the hill, to a forest, a river and a mission station, is Zulu and means ‘at the aloes’.

References

Populated places in the Dr Nkosazana Dlamini-Zuma Local Municipality